NRFC may refer to:

Nakhon Ratchasima F.C.
Newbury R.F.C.
Newlyn RFC
Newport RFC
Newport Rugby Football Club (Rhode Island)
Nomads RFC
Northern Rangers Football Club
Northolt Rugby Football Club
Nottingham R.F.C.
Nottinghamians RFC
Nuneaton R.F.C.
Norwich R.F.C.